Jaroslav Jareš (21 March 1930 – 5 September 2016) was a Czech football player and manager.

During his Czechoslovakian first division career, Jareš played for Slavia Prague and Sparta Prague. He won the Czechoslovak First League with Sparta in 1954.

After finishing his active career, Jareš started to work as a football manager. He coached Slavia Prague in two separate stints, once in 1973-1979 and again in 1984–1986. Under his management, Slavia ended up third in the Czechoslovak League on four occasions. From 1987-1990 he coached Dukla Prague and finished second in the league in the 1987–1988 season.

References

  SK Slavia Praha profile
  FK Dukla Praha: Jaroslav JAREŠ – významné životní jubileum – 80 let

1930 births
2016 deaths
Footballers from Prague
Czech footballers
Czechoslovak footballers
SK Slavia Prague players
AC Sparta Prague players
Czech football managers
Czechoslovak football managers
SK Slavia Prague managers
Dukla Prague managers
Association football forwards
SK Sparta Krč players